Jodie Anna Burrage (born 28 May 1999) is a British tennis player. She has a career-high WTA singles ranking of 126, achieved on 21 November 2022, and a career-high doubles ranking of world No. 329, set on 12 July 2021. She has won four singles and five doubles titles on the ITF Circuit.

Early life
Burrage was born in Kingston upon Thames but grew up in Hindhead, Surrey. She won a scholarship to Talbot Heath School in Bournemouth, which enabled her to develop her tennis at the nearby West Hants Club. Following the completion of GCSE exams Burrage relocated to Junior Tennis Coaching (JTC) in Chiswick, London, where she was guided by former tour professionals Colin Beecher and Lucie Ahl.

Professional career

2020–2021: WTA Tour and Grand Slam debut
Burrage made her WTA Tour main-draw debut in doubles at the 2020 Linz Open, where she received a wildcard into the doubles tournament partnering Sabine Lisicki.

In January 2021, she made her WTA Tour main-draw debut in singles at the Abu Dhabi Open as a lucky loser. In June, she had her main-draw Grand Slam debut, after being given a wildcard to the 2021 Wimbledon Championships.

2022: First top-5 win, top 150 debut
At the Eastbourne International, she defeated top seed and world No. 4, Paula Badosa. As a result, she made her top 150 debut at world No. 141 in the WTA singles rankings. On 26 September, she reached her new career-high ranking of 137.

Sponsorship
Jodie Burrage is sponsored by Midstream Lighting in the form of an EV car and Komodo Fashion.

Grand Slam performance timeline

Singles

Doubles

ITF Circuit finals

Singles: 13 (4 titles, 9 runner-ups)

Doubles: 8 (5 titles, 3 runner–ups)

Head to head

Top 10 wins

Notes

References

External links
 
 
 LTA profile

1999 births
Living people
British female tennis players
People from Kingston upon Thames
People educated at Talbot Heath School